Qasemali-ye Bar Aftab (also Romanized as Qāsem‘alī-ye Bar Āftāb; also known as Bar Āftāb and Bar Āftāb-e Qāsem‘alī) is a village in Teshkan Rural District, Chegeni District, Dowreh County, Lorestan Province, Iran. At the 2006 census, its population was 176, in 36 families.

References 

Towns and villages in Dowreh County